Jur Deh (also Romanized as Jūr Deh) is a village in Pir Bazar Rural District, in the Central District of Rasht County, Gilan Province, Iran. At the 2006 census, its population was 48, in 12 families.

References 

Populated places in Rasht County